Bobeica is a commune in Hîncești District, Moldova. It is composed of three villages: Bobeica, Dahnovici and Drăgușeni.

Notable people
 Constantin Bivol (born Costești, 1885 - death Chistopol, 1942) was an inhabitant of Dahnovici

References

Communes of Hîncești District